Yayasan may refer to:

Kolej Yayasan Saad (KYS), a private, fully residential school at Ayer Keroh, Melaka, Malaysia
Kolej Yayasan UEM, residential college situated in Lembah Beringin, Selangor, Malaysia
Yayasan Al-Bukhari Mosque, in Kuala Lumpur, Malaysia
Yayasan Kemanusiaan Ibu Pertiwi, Indonesian Non Profit Organisation dedicated to health and education programs for the needy in Bali
Yayasan Sultan Haji Hassanal Bolkiah, a foundation in Brunei
Yayasan Mohammad Noah Mosque, in Genting Highlands, Pahang
Yayasan Penggerak Linux Indonesia, the Indonesian Linux Motivator Foundation, a non-profit organization that develops Linux and other FOSS
Yayasan Senang Hati, non-profit organization in Bali that assists people living with disabilities
Yayasan Senyum (Smile Foundation), a non-profit organisation in Bali that helps people with craniofacial disabilities